Air Méditerranée was a French charter airline headquartered on the property of the Tarbes–Lourdes–Pyrénées Airport in Juillan. It operated chartered passenger and cargo flights, mostly to and from Paris-Charles de Gaulle Airport.

History
Air Méditerranée was established and started operations in 1997 and had its headquarters in Le Fauga, near Toulouse. In January 2015, the airline filed for receivership. By January 2016, there had been offers by potential investors to secure new funds for the struggling airline with no final decision made by the authorities.

The only incident of the airline occurred in February 2016 where a man urinated on a passenger over not being allowed to smoke on the flight. However, the victim fought back. The flight was diverted to Lyon, where both passengers were arrested.

On 15 February 2016 the airline was liquidated by the courts after amassing debts of €60m and all aircraft were returned to their lessors.

Destinations

Fleet

Prior to ceasing operations, the Air Méditerranée fleet consisted of the following aircraft:

References

External links

Official website

Defunct airlines of France
Airlines established in 1997
Airlines disestablished in 2016
French companies established in 1997
2016 disestablishments in France
Defunct charter airlines
Hautes-Pyrénées